The Mackenzie–Papineau Battalion or Mac-Paps were a battalion of Canadians who fought as part of the XV International Brigade on the Republican side in the Spanish Civil War in the late 1930s. Except for France, no other country had a greater proportion of its population volunteer in Spain as did Canada. The XV International Brigade, made up also of volunteer battalions from the United States and Britain, was involved in the Battle of Jarama, in which nine Canadians are known to have been killed.

Because the Canadian government passed legislation prohibiting citizens from participating in a foreign war, surviving veterans were not recognized in national military institutions or history. Since the late 20th century, three monuments have been installed in Canada that commemorate this battalion, including one commissioned by the government that was installed in Ottawa in 2001. The names of all the known volunteers are listed there.

History

1937
By the summer of 1937, some 1,200 Canadians were involved in the Spanish conflict. The Canadians had traveled secretly to reach Spain; some of the early volunteers were dispatched mainly with the volunteer Abraham Lincoln Battalion of Americans. Later they traveled with the North American George Washington Battalion, with about forty Canadians serving in each group.

In early May 1937, a separate battalion began to organize for the Canadians in Spain. When it was formally organized at Albacete, Spain in July 1937, the volunteers named it for William Lyon Mackenzie and Louis-Joseph Papineau. These men had led the Rebellion of 1837–1838 in Canada. They became noted politicians in the 19th century, standing for a clean and responsible government. The Canadian volunteers chose this name as a symbol of their national identity and commitment to the Republican government’s side.

At their first battle at Fuentes de Ebro, the battalion was initially commanded by American Robert G. Thompson. By November 1937, however, the battalion had its first Canadian commander, Edward Cecil-Smith.  From Toronto, Cecil-Smith was a member of the Communist Party of Canada, an author of the banned play, Eight Men Speak; a journalist, and a former militiaman. Cecil-Smith commanded the Mackenzie–Papineau Battalion for most of its existence.

The soldiers who made up the Mackenzie–Papineau Battalion came from both Canada and the United States.  Initially, there was discussion as to whether a third American battalion should be formed: in the beginning the Americans outnumbered the Canadians 2 to 1. Later, Canadians made up about half of the unit. Unlike volunteers from Britain and the United States, who included a significant number of college students and intellectuals, the Canadian contingent was almost wholly working class. Labourers had been attracted to the left by the collapse of capitalism during the Great Depression.

Many Canadian volunteers were members of the Communist Party of Canada. In general, they were self-educated about the conflict in Spain, and about the possible repercussions for Europe and the world. Many other groups also supported the Spanish Republicans and organized the Committee to Support Spanish Democracy. A good percentage of those Canadians who enlisted had been born in Europe, the two largest groups being Finns and Ukrainians.  As casualties mounted in Spain, many Spanish volunteers and later conscripts were incorporated into the unit.

Canadians who wanted to serve in Spain had to travel under false pretenses. The Parliament had passed  the Canadian Foreign Enlistment Act in April 1937, and formally applied it to Spain in July 1937, prohibiting such volunteering in a foreign war.  Even before this prohibition, recruits were generally gathered and transported in secret.

Volunteers usually went first to Toronto, where they met at the headquarters for the operation, located at Queen and Spadina streets.  Applicants were screened.  For the most part anyone intending to enlist had to have had a history of working for the left.  Drunken and adventurous types were weeded out, leaving those who were ideologically committed to the politics of the fight against fascism. These factors, together with the comparatively mature age of the soldiers – 61.5% were over thirty – resulted in a powerful and committed force. From Toronto they traveled to Montreal or, more frequently, New York City, to depart by ships for travel across the Atlantic Ocean to France. They continued to Spain by ship or on foot across the Pyrenees.

1938
Over the next year, the Mackenzie–Papineau Battalion fought in several major battles, including the Battle of Teruel (December 1937 – March 1938) and the Aragon Offensive (March–April), more commonly known to the Republican forces as the "Retreats." The Finnish-American machine gun companies successfully repelled the Nationalist forces, but the collapse of the front on their flanks forced them to join the withdrawal. Their final engagement was the Battle of the Ebro (July–September). This decisive Nationalist victory broke the back of the Republican forces.

In the end, Spanish Prime Minister Negrín ordered the International Brigades withdrawn on September 21, 1938. Madrid fell six months later on March 28, 1939. By the end of the war, 721 had died of the 1,546 Canadians known to have fought in Spain.

The return of survivors to Canada was arduous. The Canadian government continued its policy of ignoring or prosecuting the veterans of Spain, in accordance with the Foreign Enlistment Act. They depended on friends and family to collect the money to get them home; some men were arrested in France. It was not until January 1939 that the government agreed the veteran combatants could return to Canada. Upon their return, many were investigated by the RCMP because of communist party affiliations. Some were denied employment. A good number of the Mac-Pap veterans fought in the Second World War, but a number were prohibited because of their history.

Legacy and commemoration
Because the Canadian government did not participate in the Spanish Civil War, the volunteers do not have status in military institutions or such national memory. The Canadians who died in the Spanish Civil War are not included in the Books of Remembrance in the Peace Tower. Their sacrifice is not commemorated on federal war memorials or in Remembrance Day services. Those who survived the war are not entitled to veterans' benefits.

But since the late 20th century, a group known as the Veterans and Friends of the Mackenzie–Papineau Battalion have gained government permission and installed three monuments to commemorate these veterans. The first monument was erected in Toronto on June 4, 1995 at Queen's Park. The monument is a large boulder transported from the battlefield of Gandesa, Spain. Attached to the boulder is a memorial plaque for the Mackenzie–Papineau Battalion. A monument to the Mackenzie–Papineau Battalion was unveiled February 12, 2000 in Victoria, British Columbia. 

Another monument to the Mac-Pap veterans was erected in Ottawa in 2001 on Green Island Park. This effort was also organized and funded by Veterans and Friends of the Mackenzie–Papineau Battalion. The monument includes the names of the 1,546 Canadian volunteers who served in Spain.  This number includes all those who served in the Mac-Pap battalion; the medical, communications, transportation and translation corps; or in other brigades. The monument was designed by architect Oryst Sawchuck of Sudbury, selected in a juried competition by the organizers. It shows a figure of Prometheus raising his arm towards the sun, cut out of a  sheet of steel. A 12-metre memorial wall is inscribed with volunteers' names.

Dr. Norman Bethune, who greatly developed the use of mobile army medical units for the Republican side, is one of the few Canadians to be recognized for his service in Spain.

See also

Spanish Civil War
Military history of Canada
Spanish Civil War – Nova Scotia
Spanish Republican Armed Forces

References

Bibliography
Beeching, William C. Canadian Volunteers: Spain 1936–1939. Regina: U. of Regina, 1989.
Hoar, Victor and Reynolds, Mac. The Mackenzie-Papineau Battalion: The Canadian Contingent in the Spanish Civil War.  Toronto (Copp Clark), 1969.  
Howard, Victor, with Reynolds, Mac. The Mackenzie-Papineau Battalion: The Canadian Contingent in the Spanish Civil War. Ottawa: Carleton University, 1986.   online

 Petrou, Michael. Renegades: Canadians in the Spanish Civil War. Vancouver: UBC Press, 2008.
Zuehlke, Mark (2007) ''The Gallant Cause: Canadians in the Spanish Civil War, 1936–1939, Wiley & Sons Canada

Further reading

External links
 Friends of the Mackenzie-Papineau Battalion
 Governor General of Canada's Speech on the Occasion of the Unveiling of the MacKenzie-Papineau Battalion Monument – Archive.org cached version of Governor General's speech
 To My Son In Spain: Finnish Canadians in the Spanish Civil War (Thunderstone Pictures)

Military history of Canada
Canada in the World Wars and Interwar Years
International Brigades
Communism in Canada
Socialism in Canada
Anarchism in Canada
Canadian people of the Spanish Civil War
Military units and formations established in 1937
Military units and formations disestablished in 1938
Foreign volunteers in the Spanish Civil War